Thembalethu Brian Ntuli (born 7 March 1991), also known by his professional name Themba Mncube or MrMbus, is a South African filmmaker and actor. He is best known for the roles in the television serials such as Rhythm City, B&B and the film Lokoza.

Personal life
Mncube was born on 7 March 1991 in South Africa. He grew up in Ekhuruleni on the East Rand. He completed education from Germiston. Since school times, he went to drama classes. He graduated with a degree in filmmaking from the AFDA, The School for the Creative Economy (AFDA Johannesburg).

He is married to his longtime partner Hope Masilo. They started the affair in 2008. The wedding was held at EnGedi: The Oasis in the Cradle, Muldersdrift in March 2019.

Career
As a model, he appeared in the popular television commercials for 'Sunlight' and 'South African Broadcasting Corporation' (SABC2). After graduation, he joined with Moonyeen Lee and Associates. In 2008 when he was in grade 11, Mncube played the recurring role as young car guard "Pule" in the e.tv soap opera Rhythm City. Even though his role became popular, he had a short stint with the serial from May to June, 2008. In the same year, Mncube starred in a brand campaign for SABC2. In 2011, he became very popular with the television commercial 'Vodacom'.

In 2011, he worked as the script supervisor for Bomb Shelter Productions. During this time, he made debut direction with the film Hoek-Line released in February 2012. The film received mixed reviews where he dedicated the film to his late father. In 2013, he joined with Vusmo Media as an editor and cinematographer. Under them, he made second directorial venture, a short film titled Njengo’Thando. In 2015, he made lead role of "Cuba" in the e.tv sitcom B&B. In 2016, he acted in the film Lokoza directed by Isabelle Mayor. The film received critics acclaim. In 2018, he acted in the film Frank & Fearless, and Meerkat Maantuig.

Filmography

References

External links
 

Living people
South African male film actors
South African male television actors
1991 births